St. Colm's High School is a Roman Catholic co-educational secondary school situated in the Twinbrook area, on the edge of Belfast, Northern Ireland.

Academics
The school provides instruction in a range of academic subjects besides the core subjects English, Maths and Science. At Key Stage 3 these include 
Geography, Drama, Technology & Design, ICT, History, Home Economics, Music, Irish, Art & Design, Spanish. At Key Stage 4 optional subjects include Art & Design, Irish, Music, Religion, Geography, Drama, Textiles, History, Business Studies, Performing Arts and Religious Education.

Notable alumni
 Danny Baker - MLA for Belfast West; 77th Lord Mayor of Belfast

References  

Secondary schools in Belfast
Catholic secondary schools in Northern Ireland